Jeremiah O'Brien (January 21, 1778 – May 30, 1858) was a United States Representative from Maine. He was born in Machias, Massachusetts (now in Maine). He attended the common schools. 
 
He then engaged in lumber manufacturing and in shipping.  He was elected as member of the Maine State Senate from 1821 to 1824. He was elected as an Adams-Clay Democratic-Republican to the Eighteenth Congress, and reelected as an Adams candidate to the Nineteenth, and Twentieth Congresses (March 4, 1823 – March 3, 1829).  He served as chairman for the Committee on Expenditures for the United States Department of the Navy (Nineteenth Congress).

He was an unsuccessful candidate for reelection in 1828 to the Twenty-first Congress.  He was a member of the Maine State House of Representatives from 1832 to 1834.  He resumed his former lumber manufacturing and shipping business, and died in Boston, Massachusetts on May 30, 1858.  His interment is in O’Brien Cemetery in Machias.

References

 

1778 births
1858 deaths
Members of the Maine House of Representatives
Maine state senators
Maine Democratic-Republicans
People from Machias, Maine
Democratic-Republican Party members of the United States House of Representatives
National Republican Party members of the United States House of Representatives from Maine